John Wolcott Stewart (November 24, 1825October 29, 1915) was an American lawyer and politician from Vermont. He served as Speaker of the Vermont House of Representatives and as the 33rd governor of Vermont before serving in the United States House of Representatives and briefly in the United States Senate.

Biography
Born in Middlebury, Vermont, Stewart attended the Middlebury Academy, and graduated from Middlebury College in 1846. He studied law with Horatio Seymour, and was admitted to the bar in 1850. He served as State's Attorney of Addison County from 1852 to 1854. He married Emma Seymour Battell on November 21, 1860, and they had five children. Emma Battell was the daughter of Philip Battell and Emma Hart Seymour, and Emma Hart Seymour was the daughter of Horatio Seymour.  Stewart's brother Dugald served as Vermont Auditor of Accounts from 1864 to 1870.

Career
Stewart served as a member of the Vermont House of Representatives in 1856, and then was a member of the Vermont Senate from 1861 to 1862. He returned to the state House from 1865 to 1867, serving as Speaker, and then became the governor of Vermont from 1870 to 1872. He was the first governor of the state to serve a two-year term.  Until 1870, Vermont governors were elected annually. Later he returned to the state House from 1876 to 1878, and again served as Speaker.

Stewart was elected as a Republican to the U.S. House of Representatives in the 1882 election. He was subsequently reelected and served from March 4, 1883, to March 3, 1891. He declined to be a candidate for renomination in 1890, but instead engaged in the banking business at Middlebury. Stewart was appointed to the Senate on March 24, 1908, to fill the vacancy caused by the death of Redfield Proctor, and served until October 21 of that year, when a successor was elected.

Death
Stewart retired from political life and active business pursuits, and resided in Middlebury until his death. He is interred at West Cemetery, Middlebury, Addison County, Vermont.

References

External links
Seymour-Conkling family of New York Political Graveyard
Baldwin family of Connecticut Political Graveyard
Hoar family of Massachusetts Political Graveyard
A Dance to Remember: Emma Hart Seymour, Philip Battell, and the Commencement Ball of 1826
Phillip Battell Biographies of Addison County, Vermont
John Wolcott Stewart Biographies of Addison County, Vermont
John W. Stewart Middlebury College
"Museum Offers a Look into the Life of local Jewel, Jessica Swift” Henry Sheldon Museum of Vermont History
Swift House Inn

Encyclopedia, Vermont Biography
National Governors Association

1825 births
1915 deaths
Republican Party governors of Vermont
People from Middlebury, Vermont
Vermont lawyers
State's attorneys in Vermont
Republican Party Vermont state senators
Middlebury College alumni
Speakers of the Vermont House of Representatives
Republican Party United States senators from Vermont
Burials in Vermont
Republican Party members of the United States House of Representatives from Vermont
19th-century American politicians
Seymour family (U.S.)
19th-century American lawyers
19th-century American businesspeople